The Joseph Rowntree School is a comprehensive school on Haxby Road in New Earswick in the unitary authority City of York, England.

Admissions
The school is just north of Huntington, close to the A1237 bypass, the Foss Walk, and the River Foss. The school has a sixth form.

History
The Joseph Rowntree Village Trust maintains the model village of New Earswick, built by the Quaker organisation. It is analogous to Bournville and the Cadbury family, who were also Quakers. The village of Earswick is on the other side of the A1237 and the river, to the north-east. The primary school opened in 1912. The school was built when the area was in the North Riding Local Education Authority. It opened on 12 January 1942 to serve the Flaxton Rural District, comprising nineteen villages. It was officially opened on 7 July 1942 by Rab Butler. It had a capacity for 480, based on class sizes of 40. From 1944, it was proposed to make the school bi-lateral, with a technical school section of the school intake.

In 2016, the school was successfully sued for £180,000 due to disabled discrimination of a former employee.

Comprehensive school
The early 1970s were a period of change for the school. In 1973 the long planned raising of the school leaving age to 16 came into effect, in the same year North Riding Education Committee adopted the comprehensive system. As a result of the 1974 local government reorganisation of 1974 the school continued as a comprehensive under control of North Yorkshire County Council, with intake mainly from the Ryedale District Council catchment area. With 1973 being the first year with a full fifth form, by 1974 there were sufficient numbers for the creation of a sixth form, although initially only fourteen pupils took advantage. Five academic subjects were available with the first A Levels awarded in 1976.

Education in York was reorganised in 1985 and the school became a comprehensive. When the York bypass was built in 1985, a subway was built for walking to Haxby from the school.

School reconstruction
Construction began on the £29 million reconstruction project in September 2008, and was completed in early 2010. It was built by Carillion, with an energy efficient building with a biomass boiler and 120-seat lecture theatre. The old school was demolished and used as foundation material for a car park.

The school has a main hall, playing fields, a sport centre, and an ASD unit. Each department is called a cluster, named after a famous topic or individual corresponding to the department's subject, such as Turing, Faraday and Vaudeville.

Academic results
Results at GCSE are at the England average. In 2009 72% of students achieved 5 or more passes at GCSE A*–C. At A-level in 2009, 99% of students achieved grade A to E, 90% achieved A to C and 60% of students achieved A's or B's.

Diplomas
Joseph Rowntree School offers the Society, Health and Development diploma for young people aged 14–19.

Former students
 Sam Byram – professional footballer for Norwich City
 Mark Addy – actor, The Thin Blue Line, Game of Thrones, The Full Monty

See also
 Huntington School, York – nearby school
 Bootham School – independent school set up by Quakers, and attended by the Rowntree family

References

External links
 Joseph Rowntree School
 New Build proposals
 Open University programme about the school
 Joseph Rowntree Housing Trust
 Expedition Kenya 2010
 TimeChange Digital Stories
 60th anniversary
 Photographs of the area including the school
 EduBase

Educational institutions established in 1942
1942 establishments in England
Secondary schools in York
Voluntary controlled schools in England